Simon Wilson is a New Zealand equestrian. He participated in FEI World Cup Jumping 2008/2009.

References

Year of birth missing
Year of death missing
New Zealand male equestrians